The 2007 European 10 m Events Championships were held in Deauville, France.

Men's events

Women's events

Medal table

See also
 European Shooting Confederation
 International Shooting Sport Federation
 List of medalists at the European Shooting Championships
 List of medalists at the European Shotgun Championships

References

External links
 Official results

European Shooting Championships
European Shooting Championships
European Shooting Championships
2007 European Shooting Championships
European 10 m Events Championships